The NS 7700 was a series of tank engines of the Dutch Railways (NS) and its predecessor the Hollandsche IJzeren Spoorweg-Maatschappij (HSM).

History 
To increase the speed on the local railway lines to 50 km/h, the HSM needed stronger tank engines than the existing ones with four driving wheels. Eight six wheeled locomotives, comparable to the four locomotives of the series 1001-1004 taken over from the Haarlem-Zandvoort Spoorweg Maatschappij, were ordered from Werkspoor. These entered service with the numbers 1005–1012 in 1905 and 1906. Two follow-up orders were soon placed with Werkspoor, which entered service in 1908 and 1909 as 1013-1018 and 1019–1022. In 1912, a follow-up series 1023-1034 built by Henschel was put into service, after which another series, delivered by Werkspoor, followed in 1913 as 1035–1043. Finally, in 1914, Schwartzkopff built the last successor series that entered service as 1044–1048.

When the locomotive and rolling stock fleet of the HSM and the SS was merged in 1921, the locomotives of this series were given the NS numbers 7701–7744. Because these were often used on the Haarlemmermeer railway lines, they were nicknamed 'Haarlemmermeertjes' by the staff. But the series was also used to replace the series 6700 on the GOLS lines in Overijssel. The 7700s were also used between Dieren – Apeldoorn and Apeldoorn – Zwolle. After the series 5000, 5300 and 7000 replaced them in 1928, the series 7700 was increasingly used for shunting or put into storage.

Since 1931–1933, Nos. 7737–7744, had couplings fitted for running with tram rolling stock, they were used on the tram line between Alkmaar and Bergen.

During World War II, when the diesel locomotives were withdrawn from service due to fuel shortages, the stored NS 7700 series returned to service. After the war, the series NS 7700 was withdrawn from service between 1945 and 1955.

Royal Blast Furnaces 
In 1941 the NS 7732 was sold to the Koninklijke Hoogovens, who put the locomotive into service with the number 27 after a thorough rebuild the locomotive ran between the station Beverwijk and the Blast Furnaces. Due to the lower loading gauge on the site of the Blast Furnaces, the chimney was shortened and the front of the smokebox was painted with scare stripes, as is usual with the Hoogovens. The locomotive was withdrawn from service in 1956 and subsequently scrapped.

Bello 
'Bello' is the nickname of steam locomotive NS 7742, which has been in service on various routes in the Netherlands since 1915. The locomotive is the only preserved local railway locomotive in the Netherlands, but it owes its fame mainly to the tram line Alkmaar – Bergen aan Zee.

Bello was delivered to the HIJSM by the Berlin factory Schwartzkopff in 1914 and ran as locomotive No. 1046 from 1915 on all kinds of local railway lines such as the so-called Haarlemmermeer lines, the lines Dieren – Apeldoorn and Apeldoorn – Zwolle and lines of the GOLS in the east of the Netherlands. The locations of the locomotive at that time included Apeldoorn, Winterswijk, Neede, Doetinchem, Uithoorn and Hattem. In 1921, HSM No. 1046 was renumbered NS No. 7742. On June 1, 1927, she was involved in a cyclone disaster. On this day she was in the shed for maintenance in Neede when the roof of the shed collapsed and ended up on the NS 7742. The locomotive was repaired in Wpc Haarlem. From 1932 she was used on the tram line Alkmaar – Bergen aan Zee. After August 31, 1955, the route was closed by the NS, the day after the NS 7742 had made its farewell run on the line.

Bello returned to Bergen in 1960 and was erected as a monument in the middle of the village. Standing still in all weathers proved to be detrimental to its lifespan, so in 1978 the locomotive was sold to the Museum Steam Tram Hoorn-Medemblik for the symbolic amount of one NLG. The restoration lasted until 1985. On April 3, 1985, the newly built separate boiler was tested. Many newspapers then reported, not entirely correctly, "Bello is under steam again". On August 4, the locomotive ran under its own power for the first time. On August 6, the locomotive made its first kilometers on the Hoorn – Medemblik line, in a return trip to Wognum, with an inspector from NS on board, who approved the locomotive for service. On August 9, the first day of the first 'Bello Festival', the locomotive was festively inaugurated with a run with invited guests. However, the SHM management continued to regard this as one of the test runs and the official run took place on June 26, 1986.

In practice, the SHM mainly uses the locomotive for the daily afternoon tram in the high season, with the Dutch wooden tram carriages. In July 2010, it was celebrated that the locomotive had traveled a total of 1,000,000 kilometers.

In May 2014, NS 7742 got a completely new chimney, this one was made in England, to replace the old original chimney. A new smokebox door has also been made, which is made according to the NS model. On Saturday 13 September, Bello returned to Bergen once more on the occasion of the Open Monument Day 2014 with the theme 'On a Journey'. The locomotive was transported to the village on a low-loader and was on display on the town square.

A few traces of the former tram line can still be found in Bergen. For example, there is still a Stationsstraat, and something of the route can still be recognized in the line Dreef – Plein – Berkenlaan – Rondelaan.

The name 'Bello' was never given to any locomotive of the series. The term became a nickname among the public for all small locomotives on local railways and tramways that regularly rang their bell loudly when passing a level crossing or on the side of a road. The line Alkmaar – Bergen aan Zee was one of the last lines they were used on. When locomotive NS 7742 became a monument in Bergen, the nickname was given to this locomotive.

In the miniature city of Madurodam there is a model of NS 7742.

Overview

Gallery

External links 

 Locomotief 7742 in de Nederlandse Museummaterieel Database
 Locomotief 7742 in het Nationaal Register Railmonumenten
 Locomotief 7742 bij de Museumstoomtram

Sources 

 hvb-nh.nl Historische Vereniging Bergen - Stoomloc NS 7742 "Bello"
 nicospilt.com/Loc7742.htm Stoomloc NS 7742 "Bello"
 S. Selleger: Bello, uitgeverij Pirola, Schoorl, 1979. 
 H. Waldorp: Onze Nederlandse stoomlocomotieven in woord en beeld, uitgeverij De Alk, Alkmaar, 1981 (5e druk). 
 H. Waldorp: Onze Nederlandse Stoomlocomotieven, uitgeverij De Alk, Alkmaar, 1986 (7e druk). 
 "De Stoomtram" nrs. 22-28
 J. van der Meer: De Hollandsche IJzeren Spoorweg-Maatschappij, uitgeverij Uquilair, 2009, 
 Remmo Statius Muller: Trams en treinen in de jaren 30 tot '50 uit het archief van M. van Notten, uitgeverij Elmar, Rijswijk, 1987. 
 H. de Herder: Nederlandse industrielocomotieven. Uitg. Uquilair, 2007. 

Rolling stock of the Netherlands
Steam locomotives of the Netherlands
Haarlem-Zandvoort Spoorweg Maatschappij
Hollandsche IJzeren Spoorweg-Maatschappij
Werkspoor locomotives
Henschel locomotives
Berliner locomotives